Muyuw language (Egum, Murua, Murua Dukwayasi, Murua Kaulae, Muruwa, Muyu, Muyua, Muyuwa) is one of the Kilivila–Louisiades languages (of the Austronesian language family), spoken on the Woodlark Islands, in the Solomon Sea within Papua New Guinea.

, the number of speakers is 6,000, 3,000 of whom are monolinguals. Speakers also use Dobu, Kilivila or Misima-Paneati. Latin script is used.

Dialects include Yanaba, Lougaw (Gawa), Wamwan, Nawyem, and Iwa. The Iwa dialect is transitional between Muyuw and Kilivila. Its lexical similarity with Kilivila is 68%.

Phonology 
Phonology of the Muyuw language:

Consonants

Vowels

References

Papuan Tip languages
Languages of Milne Bay Province
Woodlark Islands